DebConf, the Debian developers conference is the yearly conference where developers of the Debian operating system meet to discuss further development of the system.

Besides the scheduled workshops and talks, Debian developers take the opportunity to hack on the Debian system in a more informal setting. This has been institutionalised by introducing the DebCamp in the Oslo DebConf in 2003: a room is set aside and computing infrastructure provided.

Locations
Locations of past and future DebConf events:

Miniconf 
These were one-day miniature conferences, originally held in association with the main linux.conf.au Australian Linux conference. They were targeted towards specific communities of interest and offered delegates an opportunity to network with other enthusiasts while immersing themselves in a specific topic or project.

Locations of past LCA Miniconf events:

MiniDebConf 
This is a smaller Debian event, held annually in various places in the world.

Locations of past and future MiniDebConf events:

Attendance 
According to a 2013 brochure, the conference had about 30 attendees in 2000 while in 2011 there were around 300 attendees, and about 250 are expected.

References

External links

 DebConf website
 DebConf video archive

Linux conferences
Debian
Free-software conferences
Recurring events established in 2000